Walter Carlos' Clockwork Orange is a studio album by American musician and composer Wendy Carlos, released under her birth name Walter, in 1972 by Columbia Records. The album contains previously unreleased and complete tracks from her score to Stanley Kubrick's 1971 film A Clockwork Orange that had been cut or omitted from the official soundtrack, Stanley Kubrick's Clockwork Orange, released three months earlier.

In April 2000, the album was reissued with bonus tracks under a new title, A Clockwork Orange: Wendy Carlos's Complete Original Score.

Background
The album includes the complete version of Carlos's composition "Timesteps", originally intended as a lead-in to an electronic arrangement of the fourth movement to Symphony No. 9 by Beethoven. Carlos had written the opening to "Timesteps" prior to working on the film. She picked up the same-titled novel and noticed that the piece reflected the feeling of the first few chapters. Thereafter the piece developed into "an autonomous composition with an uncanny affinity for 'clockwork'" (the last word being Carlos's way of referring to the book). Among the instruments Carlos used for the score include a "spectrum follower", a prototype of a vocoder that converted the human voice into electronic signals that mirror the original note that has been played. Since the Ninth Symphony has a chorale section in the finale, Carlos felt it was an appropriate challenge for the new device.  When the film version was announced Carlos and producer Rachel Elkind made a demonstration recording for Kubrick, who became interested and invited them to meet him in London.

The outcome was not entirely satisfying to Carlos in terms of total contribution to the film, but there remained the opportunity to present the music in a separate album, which led to this collection.

Artwork
The record label did not attempt to use images from the movie on the album cover. The image chosen was a surrealistic collage of objects and images representing ideas in the film by visual artist Karenlee Grant. These included a rifle, an image of Beethoven inside the numeral "9", various mechanical images including a clockwork mechanism superimposed on a sliced orange, dancers representing the classical themes, and so on. This again was not entirely to Carlos' and Elkind's liking.

For the CD re-release, an image parodying the film's own logo was created and used on the cover—depicting Beethoven holding out a glass of drugged milk through the film poster's iconic "A"-shaped image—with the original cover image on the back cover of the included booklet.

Track listing

Original release (LP) (1972) 
The original release contains the following tracks:
Side 1

Side 2

CD release (2000)

References

External links
 
 

1972 albums
1970s classical albums
Wendy Carlos soundtracks
Wendy Carlos's Complete Original Score
Albums produced by Rachel Elkind